Linda Lowery is an American author and illustrator.

Education
Lowery graduated with a degree in French from De Paul University.

Works
Linda Lowery wrote the Endless Quest gamebook Spell of the Winter Wizard in 1983, and the HeartQuest gamebooks Secret Sorceress and Moon Dragon Summer for TSR.

She also writes and illustrates children's books. Her titles include Hannah and the Angels: Mission Down Under (1998), Trick or Treat, It's Halloween! (2000), Who Wants a Valentine? (2002), One More Valley, One More Hill: The Story of Aunt Clara Brown (2003), and Day of the Dead (2003).

References

External links

20th-century American novelists
20th-century American women writers
21st-century American novelists
21st-century American women writers
American illustrators
American women illustrators
American women novelists
DePaul University alumni
Living people
Place of birth missing (living people)
Women science fiction and fantasy writers
Year of birth missing (living people)